Robert Charles Davidson  LL. D.  D.F.A. (born 4 November 1946), is a Canadian artist of Haida heritage. He is a leading figure in the renaissance of Haida art and culture. He lives in White Rock, British Columbia.

Life and work

Davidson is known internationally as a carver of totem poles and masks, printmaker, painter and jeweller.  He lives near Vancouver, working out of a studio on Semiahmoo First Nation land and making annual return visits to Haida Gwaii.

Davidson was born in Hydaburg, Alaska. His parents are Claude and Vivian Davidson. Through Claude, he is the grandson of the Haida artist and memoirist Florence Davidson.  He is a member of the Eagle moiety, Ts'ał'lanas lineage.  His younger brother and former apprentice, Reg Davidson, is also a Haida carver.

In infancy, Robert Davidson moved with his family to the Haida village of Masset, British Columbia, on Haida Gwaii (Queen Charlotte Islands). For high school, he moved to Vancouver to attend Point Grey Secondary School in 1965. In 1966 he became apprenticed to the master Haida carver Bill Reid.  In 1967 he began studies at the Vancouver School of Art.  In 1969 he carved and raised the first totem pole on Haida Gwaii in approximately ninety years.

His works are included in the collections of the National Gallery of Canada, the Canadian Museum of Civilization and the Vancouver Art Gallery. His style, which engages with both Haida and Western art history, has been described as "contemporary-traditional", reflecting an overlap of "community-based and outsider-orientated" artistic projects.

A significant solo exhibition of his work, Robert Davidson: The Abstract Edge, was organized by the Museum of Anthropology at the University of British Columbia (UBC) for viewing at the National Gallery of Canada in Ottawa in 2007. From November 2022 until april 2023 the Vancouver Art Gallery is presenting an exhibition with the title A Line That Bends But Does Not Break, showcasing a collection of Davidson's graphic work, including paintings from private collections.

Robert Davidson was the subject of the documentary Haida Modern, which premiered at the Vancouver International Film Festival in 2019. He also appeared in Eugene Boyko's 1970 short documentary film This Was the Time and Christopher Auchter's 2019 short documentary film Now Is the Time.

Awards and recognition
 Honorary Doctor of Fine Arts, University of Victoria, 1992
 Honorary Doctor of Laws, Simon Fraser University, 1994
 Order of British Columbia, 1995
 National Aboriginal Achievement Award, now the Indspire Awards, 1995
 Member of the Order of Canada, 1996
 Honorary Doctor of Letters (D.Litt.), University of British Columbia, 2007
 Aboriginal Art Lifetime Achievement Awards, BC Achievement Foundation, 2007
 Governor General's Awards in Visual and Media Arts, Canada Council, 2010
 Member, Royal Canadian Academy of Arts
 The Audain Prize for Lifetime Achievement in the Visual Arts, 2010

Notes

Sources

 Blackman, Margaret B. (1982; rev. ed., 1992) During My Time: Florence Edenshaw Davidson, a Haida Woman.  Seattle: University of Washington Press.
 Jensen, Doreen, and Polly Sargent (1986) Robes of Power: Totem Poles on Cloth.  Vancouver: University of British Columbia Press.
 Macnair, Peter L., Alan L. Hoover, and Kevin Neary (1984) The Legacy: Tradition and Innovation in Northwest Coast Indian Art.  Vancouver, B.C.: Douglas & McIntyre.
 Stewart, Hilary (1993). Looking at Totem Poles.  Seattle: University of Washington Press. .
 Robert Davidson lands lifetime achievement award By Alex Browne, Arts Reporter, Peace Arch News, 12 June 2007
 Rhyne, Charles, Robert Davidson, and Susan Fillin-Yeh (1998) Expanding the Circle: The Art of Guud San Glans, Robert Davidson.  Portland, Ore: Douglas F. Cooley Memorial Art Gallery, Reed College.

External links
Robert Davidson official website
Douglas Reynolds Gallery (Vancouver, Canada)
Spirit Wrestler Gallery (Vancouver, Canada)
 Kinsman Robinson Galleries
Order of British Columbia: Robert Davidson
Robert Charles Davidson at The Canadian Encyclopedia

1946 births
Living people
20th-century First Nations sculptors
Canadian male sculptors
20th-century Canadian male artists
21st-century First Nations people
Alaska Native people
First Nations painters
Governor General's Award in Visual and Media Arts winners
Haida woodcarvers
Indspire Awards
Members of the Order of British Columbia
Officers of the Order of Canada
Members of the Royal Canadian Academy of Arts
Northwest Coast art
Totem pole carvers
People from White Rock, British Columbia